Istanbul Waste Power Plant is a waste-to-energy facility in the Eyüp district of Istanbul, Turkey, using waste incineration. Opened in 2021 it is owned by the Istanbul Metropolitan Municipality (İBB) and operated by İstanbul Environmental Management Co. (İSTAÇ). It is Turkey's first power plant of this type.

Overview
The waste-to-energy plant was built by a consortium of the Swiss Hitachi Zosen Inova and the Turkish Makyol. Construction began on 16 September 2017. Located in the Işıklar (formerly Kısırmandıra) neighborhood of the Eyüp district of Istanbul, it was opened on 26 November 2021. The plant is owned by the Istanbul Metropolitan Municipality (İBB) and operated by İstanbul Environmental Management Co. (İSTAÇ), a subsidiary of the Metropolitan Municipality. It is Turkey's first waste-to-energy facility.

Characteristics
The plant is capable of combustion of 3,000 tons of waste daily, 15% of Istanbul's daily domestic waste. It can generate 78 MW⋅h electrical energy and 175 MW⋅h thermal energy. The generated electricity is equivalent to the needs of nearly 1.4 million people. A reduction of greenhouse gas emissions amounting to 1.38 million tons can be achieved, which is the amount of exhaust gas emission of about 700.000 vehicles. 90 people are employed in the facility.

References

Waste power stations in Turkey
Buildings and structures in Istanbul Province
Energy infrastructure completed in 2021
2021 establishments in Turkey
Eyüp
21st-century architecture in Turkey